Johngarthia planata, sometimes known as the Clipperton crab, is a bright orange species of land crab that lives on Clipperton Island in the eastern Pacific; on Malpelo Island, west of Colombia; and on Socorro Island in the Revillagigedo Islands off Mexico, 900 km north of Clipperton. It is omnivorous and feeds on seaweed (algae), vegetation and sometimes carrion.

The introduction of pigs on Clipperton Island by guano miners in the 1890s reduced the crab population: this in turn allowed grassland to gradually cover about 80 percent of the land surface. The elimination of these pigs in 1958 — as the result of a personal project by Kenneth E. Stager — has caused most of this vegetation to disappear, resulting in the return of millions of J. planata. A 2005 report by the NOAA's Southwest Fisheries Science Center in La Jolla, California, USA indicates that the increased rat presence has led to a decline in the crab population, causing a corresponding increase in both vegetation and coconut palms. This report urgently recommended eradication of rats so that vegetation might be reduced and the island might return to its "pre-human" state.

References
Notes

External links

Grapsoidea
Terrestrial crustaceans
Crustaceans described in 1860